The Sri Thendayuthapani Temple, better known as the Chettiars' Temple, is one of Singapore Hindu community's most important monuments. Completed in 1984, it replaces a much earlier temple built by the Chettiars (Indian moneylenders). The temple was gazetted as a National monument of Singapore on 20 October 2014.

This Shaivite temple, dedicated to the six-faced Lord Subramaniam (Lord Muruga), is at its most active during the festival of Thaipusam, where the procession ends here. It is here, during the annual Thaipusam festival, that hundreds of pilgrims, their bodies pierced by hooks, spears and spiked steel structures called kavadi, end their walk from the Sri Srinivasa Perumal Temple on Serangoon Road. The act of penance is carried out by devotees in gratitude to Lord Subramanian or Murugan, son of Lord Siva, for granting their prayers of supplication.

References

External links
Website of Sri Thandayuthapani Temple

Hindu temples in Singapore
Tourist attractions in Singapore
Tamil diaspora
National monuments of Singapore